Dragan "Gagi" Nikolić (born February 20, 1972) is a Serbian professional basketball coach.

Coaching career 
Nikolić coached Ušće, Mladost Zemun, Metalac Valjevo
Tamiš, Proleter Zrenjanin, BKK Radnički, and Karpoš Sokoli.

On December 24, 2018, Nikolić was named a head coach of the Bosnian team Igokea. He left Igokea in June 2019.

In December 2020, Borac Banja Luka hired Nikolić as the new head coach. In July 2021, he signed one-year contract extension with Borac. He left Borac in April 2022.

References

External links
Eurobasket.com Profile

1972 births
Living people
BKK Radnički coaches
KK Metalac coaches
KK Tamiš coaches
KK Igokea coaches
KK Proleter Zrenjanin coaches
KK Mladost Zemun coaches
KK Ušće coaches
KK Vizura coaches
OKK Borac coaches
Serbian men's basketball coaches
Sportspeople from Belgrade
Serbian expatriate basketball people in Bosnia and Herzegovina
Serbian expatriate basketball people in North Macedonia
Serbian expatriate basketball people in Poland